Malcolm Stewart Craven (born 25 September 1915) was a British motorcycle speedway rider who rode before and after World War II.

Career
Craven was born in Ilford, Essex on 25 September 1915. He had a trial for Norwich Stars in 1937 but was rejected by Max Grosskreutz. After practising at the Dagenham track he was spotted by his childhood hero, the former Wembley Lions rider Colin Watson, who took him to Wembley for a trial, after which he was signed by Alec Jackson. He was loaned to the Birmingham Bulldogs for whom he finished the season as top scorer, returning to Wembley in 1938 where he initially rode at reserve, establishing himself in the top five by the following year. The war interrupted his speedway career and he joined the Merchant Navy. When league racing resumed in 1946 he signed for West Ham Hammers, staying with the club into the 1950s.

In 1947 he rode in Australia with the England Test team. He was part of the England teams that toured Australia in the 1951-1952 Test series. In 1952 he captained the England team against Scotland.

Personal life
Craven was a qualified pilot, flying to speedway matches on occasion.

Two of Craven's brothers were also speedway riders; Gil Craven rode for Cradley Heath, and his youngest brother Reg Craven was killed in a speedway crash in 1948.

References

1915 births
Possibly living people
British speedway riders
English motorcycle racers
Wembley Lions riders
West Ham Hammers riders
Norwich Stars riders
Birmingham Brummies riders